Christian Claaßen (born 22 May 1969) is a German former professional footballer who played as a forward.

References

External links

Living people
1969 births
People from Cloppenburg (district)
German footballers
Footballers from Lower Saxony
Association football forwards
Bundesliga players
2. Bundesliga players
Regionalliga players
VfL Oldenburg players
VfB Oldenburg players
SV Wilhelmshaven players
Hamburger SV players
SV Meppen players
VfL Osnabrück players